The 2011–12 Scottish Challenge Cup, known as the Ramsdens Challenge Cup due to sponsorship reasons with Ramsdens, was the 21st season of the competition. It was competed for by 32 clubs, which included the 30 members of the Scottish Football League, and for the first time the top two clubs of the Highland Football League.

The defending champions were Ross County, who defeated Queen of the South in the 2010 final but were knocked out in the first round by Third Division side Elgin City. The tournament winners were Falkirk, who defeated Hamilton Academical in the final with Darren Dods scoring the only goal of the match in the 2nd minute.

Schedule

Fixtures and results

First round 
The First round draw was conducted on 6 June 2011.

North and East region 

Source: The Scottish Football League

South and West region 

Source: The Scottish Football League

Second round 

Last updated: 9 August 2011Source: The Scottish Football League

Quarter-finals 
The quarter-final draw was conducted on 11 August 2011 at 2:00pm in a Ramsdens outlet in The Forge Shopping Centre, Glasgow.

Semi-finals 
The draw for the semi-finals of the Challenge cup took place at 2:00 pm on 7 September 2011, at Hampden Park, Glasgow.

Final

Top scorers 

Last updated on 9 October 2011

References 

Scottish Challenge Cup seasons
Challenge Cup
3